Willie Black is the name of:

 Willie Black (footballer) (1929–2015), Scottish footballer
 Willie Black, African-American golfer who constructed a golf course in Rogers Park, Tampa, member of the National Black Golf Hall of Fame
 Willie Black, a character in a series of novels by Howard Owen

See also
William Black (disambiguation)